Marokarima is a town and commune in Madagascar. It belongs to the district of Mananjary, which is a part of Vatovavy-Fitovinany Region. The population of the commune was estimated to be approximately 14,000 in 2001 commune census.

The majority 99.5% of the population of the commune are farmers.  The most important crops are coffee and bananas; also sugarcane is an important agricultural product. Services provide employment for 0.5% of the population.

References and notes 

Populated places in Vatovavy-Fitovinany